Alfred Witte (2 March 1878 in Hamburg, Germany – 4 August 1941 in Hamburg, Germany), was a German surveyor, astrologer, an amateur astronomer, and the founder of the Hamburg School of Astrology. Witte revived and further developed the use of astrological midpoints (a+b)/2 for precision in astrological analysis and prediction. Alfred Witte died 4 August 1941, Hamburg. The time of death is unclear.

Writings
In his early writings between 1919 and 1925 (his first was 1913), he experimented with numerous historical astrology techniques, including the astrological houses, planetary formulae a+b-c = c similar to Arabic parts, and for a brief period a new scheme of planetary rulerships. His approach to astrology was to verify assumptions by current reality checks rather than historical validation.  He sought to approach astrology as a science, and the controversy over his assertion of the existence of Trans-Neptunian objects other than Pluto led to widespread ridicule and rejection during his later years.

Groups of Alfred Witte's Astrology ("Uranians") 
 Astrologenverein "Hamburger Schule", Hamburg, est. 1925
 "Witte-Studiengemeinschaft Düsseldorf", Düsseldorf, est. 1932
 "Astrologische Studiengesellschaft (Hamburger Schule)", Hamburg, est. 1947
 The "Bangkok Astrological School", Bangkok, Thailand, est. 1972 
 The "Uranian Society", New York City, USA, est. 1985 
 "Uranian Astrologers Club Thailand" (UACT), Bangkok, Thailand, est. 2001
 The "International Uranian Fellowship", The Hague, Netherlands, est. 2007

Trans-Neptunian hypothesis
In Witte's times, many astronomers proposed hypothetical Trans-Neptunian objects. So Witte proposed the existence of several hypothetical Trans-Neptunian objects, too.  While modern technology has verified the existence of thousands of Trans-Neptunian objects, the specific Trans-Neptunian objects that are used by the Hamburg School and Uranian astrology have not yet been validated or disproven as of September 2011.  Some members of the Hamburg School have for a number of years asserted that some of Witte's Trans-Neptunians may actually be the barycenters of clusters of Trans-Neptunian objects, and shun both the labels "planet" and "object" for this reason.  Witte did however describe the colors of two of his inner Transneptunians, Cupido and Hades, in articles in the anthology Der Mensch - Eine Empfangsstation kosmischer Suggestionen. Witte was prohibited by the Third Reich from recording his observations during the last years of his life.

Witte was considered an enemy of the German Third Reich and his main book, the Regelwerk für Planetenbilder (Rulebook for Planetary Pictures) was banned on 2 October 1936 and later burned by the Nazis. Astrologers were interned in June 1941, including Rudolph. Witte was not interned but he was under police observation by the GeStaPo. He committed suicide (he worried about his state pension), in 1941. His work was resurrected by his students, among whom was Ludwig Rudolph, after 1945.

The American Richard Svehla, Phoenix Bookshop, Cleveland, Ohio, was in the early 1930s one of the first who introduced the Witte-Astrology in the USA. He received the authorization for the translation of the "Rules for Planetary Pictures". It was published under the subtitle "Uranian System of Astrology - Hamburg School by Alfred Witte" in 1939.

In the mid 20th century, a collection of Witte's observations and techniques came to be described in the English speaking world as Uranian astrology.

See also
 Cosmobiology
 Hamburg School of Astrology

References

1878 births
1941 suicides
German astrologers
Writers from Hamburg
German astrological writers
Suicides in Germany
German male writers